Saphan Mon (lit. "Mon Bridge") is a historic bridge in Bangkok's Phra Nakhon District. It carries Charoen Krung Road across the old city moat, and was originally built in the reign of King Rama III (1824–1851), presumably by members of the Mon community who lived nearby. During the reign of King Vajiravudh (Rama VI, 1910–1925), the original wooden structure was replaced with a reinforced concrete bridge with iron railings demonstrating Art Nouveau influence. The bridge is registered as an ancient monument by the Fine Arts Department.

The end of the bridge is four-way intersection of Charoen Krung and Atsadang Roads, also the first intersection of Charoen Krung Road.

References

Road junctions in Bangkok
Registered ancient monuments in Bangkok
Bridges in Bangkok
Art Nouveau architecture in Thailand